WTAC may refer to:

 WTAC (FM) 89.7, a radio station in Burton, Michigan, United States
 WTAC-TV channel 16, a defunct television station in Flint, Michigan, United States
 WSNL 600 AM, a radio station in Flint, Michigan, United States that previously held the WTAC call sign
 WTAC (Johnstown, Pennsylvania) an AM radio station from 1922 to 1926